Astrid Roxana Camposeco Hernández (born 27 April 1991 in Quetzaltenango, Guatemala) is a Guatemalan weightlifter. She competed for Guatemala at the 2012 Summer Olympics. She won the – 75 kg silver medals in snatch and clean & jerk during the 2014 Pan American Sports Festival.

Doping
Camposeco was disqualified during the 2015 Pan American Games when she was found to have Clenbuterol and boldenone in her system from a test performed May 23 and results published on July 9.

References

Guatemalan female weightlifters
Weightlifters at the 2012 Summer Olympics
Olympic weightlifters of Guatemala
1991 births
Living people
Doping cases in weightlifting
Weightlifters at the 2011 Pan American Games
Pan American Games competitors for Guatemala
20th-century Guatemalan women
21st-century Guatemalan women